Walking in London is the fourth studio album from alternative rock band Concrete Blonde. It features the song "...Long Time Ago" which played over the ending credits of The Shields series finale.

Walking in London peaked at number 18 on the Australian ARIA Charts.

Music
Critic Tom Demalon of AllMusic described the album as "a good record but not nearly as pleasing as its breakthrough predecessor" (1990's Bloodletting), but notes certain exceptional tracks: "Ghost of a Texas Ladies' Man", "Someday?", "Long Time Ago", and "the gorgeous ballad 'Les Cœurs Jumeaux'". In The New Yorker, Elizabeth Wurtzel offered particular praise for the cover of James Brown's "It's a Man's Man's Man's World" and its "ironic interpretation that emphasizes the second half of the chorus – the part that says 'But it wouldn't mean nothing without a woman or a girl' – and turns Brown's misogyny into a feminist anthem."

"Ghost of a Texas Ladies' Man" was released as a single.

Track listing
All songs written by Johnette Napolitano, except where noted.

PersonnelMusicians: Bernadette Colomine –	vocals, voices
 James Mankey – guitar
 Johnette Napolitano – bass, vocals
 Tom Petersson – bass
 Andy Prieboy – vocals
 Harry Rushakoff – percussion, drumsProduction:'
 Erich Baron – assistant engineer
 Sean Freehill – assistant engineer
 John Golden – mastering
 John Jackson – mixing assistant
 Earle Mankey – engineer, mixing
 Chris Marshall – engineer, assistant engineer
 Annie Sperling – art direction, photography
 Chris Tsangarides – producer

Charts

References

Concrete Blonde albums
1992 albums
I.R.S. Records albums
Albums produced by Chris Tsangarides